The name Ramona has been used for two tropical cyclones in the Eastern Pacific Ocean:

 Tropical Storm Ramona (1967)
 Tropical Storm Ramona (1971)

Pacific hurricane set index articles